Earl Lawrence Mindell (born January 20, 1940) is a Canadian-American writer and nutritionist who is a strong advocate of nutrition as preventive healthcare and homeopathy.

Early life and education 
Mindell was born to parents William and Minerva on January 20, 1940, in Saint Boniface, Manitoba. He immigrated to the United States in 1965 and was naturalized in 1972. On May 16, 1971, Mindell married Gail Andrea Jaffe; they have two children.

Mindell received a Bachelor of Science in Pharmacy from North Dakota State University in 1963. In 1995, he earned a Master Herbalist Diploma from Dominion Herbal College. Mindell earned his Ph.D. at Pacific Western University, an unaccredited institution.

Relations with the scientific community

Mindell's theories on health and nutrition have been met with criticism in the scientific community. Mindell has previously promoted oral supplements of an "anti-aging" enzyme, superoxide dismutase (SOD). There is no evidence for the supposed benefits of SOD, and it is known that the enzyme would not survive the digestive process if taken orally.

Mindell made several claims about the health benefits of wolfberry juice, commercially known as "Himalayan Goji Juice", while associated with a direct-selling company called FreeLife International Inc. Mindell's claims regarding goji juice include supposed benefits for cancer patients based on evidence of cancer cell inhibition in vitro (i.e. in a dish). In an interview with Wendy Mesley on the CBC consumer television program Marketplace (aired January 24, 2007), H. Leon Bradlow, coauthor of a study that Mindell cites as support for this anti-cancer claim, says that his research does not, in fact, prove that goji has any anti-cancer properties, and that there is no scientific evidence such effects occur in vivo (i.e., when consumed). In addition, Bradlow's study was carried out at Hackensack University Medical Center, not Memorial Sloan-Kettering Cancer Center as Mindell had claimed. When faced with this information, Mindell stated in the same interview that he will stop citing the study. Mesley then went on to confront Mindell about the validity of his PhD from Pacific Western University, and Mindell asserted that his degree is "accredited in every state in the Union."

His book Earl Mindell's Vitamin Bible was criticized by James A. Lowell in 1986, in a review reprinted by Quackwatch. The book contains over 400 errors. Professor of pharmacognosy Varro Eugene Tyler noted that Earl Mindell's Herb Bible contained many inaccurate statements and unsupported claims. Mindell has also drawn criticism for his claim that habitual lying by children can be cured by large doses of B vitamins. Nutritionist Kurt Butler has described Mindell as a "pill-peddling charlatan, and that his ideas are totally unsupportable". Mindell has asserted that vitamin A is safe to take in dosages up to 100,000 IU per day, but this claim is considered by some other mainstream scientists as controversial. He has also drawn criticism for stating that many medical doctors are uninformed about vitamins.

Selected bibliography
In total, Mindell has published over 50 books.  His most notable publication, Earl Mindell's Vitamin Bible, is a glossary of micronutrients published in 1979 and has been updated and re-released multiple times since.  An incomplete list of his books is available below.

References

External links
Official website

1940 births
Alternative cancer treatment advocates
American health and wellness writers
American homeopaths
American nutritionists
Canadian emigrants to the United States
Herbalists
Living people
North Dakota State University alumni
People from Beverly Hills, California
People from Saint Boniface, Winnipeg
Pseudoscientific diet advocates
Writers from Winnipeg